The Drift is a literary magazine founded in June 2020 by Rebecca Panovka and Kiara Barrow.

History 
In The Drift's founding essay published June 24, 2020, Barrow and Panovka wrote that they were "committed to offering a forum for young people who haven’t yet been absorbed into the media hivemind, and don’t feel hemmed in by the boundaries of the existing discourse." They told the New York Times that were inspired by podcasts like Red Scare and Chapo Trap House and that the aspire to be "the intellectual arm" of "the leftist resurgence of the past few years and figuring out what’s next, post-Bernie, to people now awakening to leftist radicalism.”

Both of The Drift's founders attended elite private New York City schools before studying at Harvard College. Rebecca Panovka, a tutor and fact checker, attended Dalton School before studying English and philosophy and editingThe Harvard Book Review. Kiara Barrow, a copyrighter, graduated from Dwight School in New York City and studied English at Harvard, where she ran The Harvard Advocate. Both graduated from Harvard in 2016.

In March 2022, The Drift had a launch party at the The Jane in Manhattan.

In September 2022, David Zwirner announced he was providing funding as part of an effort to fund a new generation of writers. In a statement to ARTnews, The Drift co-founder Kiara Barrow said that despite Zwirner's money,The Drift would remain editorially independent and would not be part of David Zwirner Books.

Content 
Notable essays from the magazine include Oscar Schwartz's “What Was the TED Talk?: Some Thoughts on the ‘Inspiresting,’” which criticizes the TED conference's focus on contrived, oversimplified content and elitist undercurrents.

Reception 
New Yorker editor David Remnick told the New York Times, “I would be a fool not to read something like The Drift.”

References

External links
 

Alternative magazines
Literary magazines published in the United States
Magazines established in 2020
Magazines published in New York City
2020 establishments in New York City